Dudleya cymosa is a species complex of evergreen and deciduous succulent plants in the family Crassulaceae known by the common name: canyon liveforever. It is a loosely defined polyphyletic species with a diverse number of subspecies, varying highly in morphology, distribution, and habitat.

Description
It is a distinctive plant sending up erect red-orange stems from a gray-green basal rosette. The small yellowish-red thimble-shaped flowers top the stems in a cyme inflorescence.  Some subspecies are considered threatened locally.

Subspecies
Recognized Dudleya cymosa subspecies:

 Dudleya cymosa subsp. agourensis K.M. Nakai - (Agoura Hills dudleya)
Dudleya cymosa subsp. crebrifolia K.M. Nakai & Verity - (San Gabriel River dudleya)
Dudleya cymosa subsp. costatifolia Bartel & Shevock - (Pierpoint springs dudleya)
Dudleya cymosa subsp. cymosa (Lem.) Britton & Rose - (canyon liveforever)
Dudleya cymosa subsp. marcescens Moran - (Marcescent dudleya)
Dudleya cymosa. subsp. ovatifolia - (Santa Monica Mountains dudleya)
Dudleya cymosa subsp. paniculata (Jeps.) K.M. Nakai - (Diablo range dudleya)
Dudleya cymosa subsp. pumila (Rose) K.M. Nakai - (Transverse ranges liveforever)

The subspecies marcescens and ovatifolia are federally listed as threatened species of the United States.

Butterfly habitat
Dudleya cymosa is the larval host plant for the Sonoran blue butterfly, Philotes sonorensis (Lycaenidae)

Notes

References

 
C.Michael Hogan, ed. 2010. Dudleya cymosa. Encyclopedia of Life.

External links

Jepson Manual Treatment: Dudleya cymosa
USDA Plants Profile — Dudleya cymosa
The Nature Conservancy

cymosa
Flora of California
Flora of Oregon
Flora of the Sierra Nevada (United States)
Natural history of the California chaparral and woodlands
Natural history of the California Coast Ranges
Natural history of the Peninsular Ranges
Natural history of the Santa Monica Mountains
Natural history of the Transverse Ranges
Garden plants of North America
Butterfly food plants
Drought-tolerant plants
Taxa named by Charles Antoine Lemaire
Taxa named by Joseph Nelson Rose
Taxa named by Nathaniel Lord Britton